Marine Air Control Squadron 24 (MACS-24) is a reserve United States Marine Corps aviation command and control squadron. The squadron provides aerial surveillance and air traffic control for the Marine Forces Reserve. The squadron is headquartered in Virginia Beach, Virginia with an Air Traffic Control detachment at Naval Air Station Joint Reserve Base Fort Worth, Texas. MACS-24 falls under the command of Marine Air Control Group 48 and the 4th Marine Aircraft Wing.

Mission
The support of air control operations as directed by the Commanding General, Marine Forces Reserve and to provide air surveillance, control of aircraft and ground-based air defense assets, and to provide navigational assistance to itinerant friendly aircraft in support of the Fleet Marine Force.

History
Marine Ground Control Intercept Squadron 24 (MGCIS-24) was commissioned on October 15, 1949 at Naval Air Station Anacostia, Washington D.C.  On March 1, 1954 that squadron was redesignated as Marine Air Control Squadron 1 (MACS-1). In October 1961 the squadron relocated to Andrews Air Force Base.  In 1965, as part of the redesign of the Marine Corps Reserve, MACS-24 joined the 4th Marine Aircraft Wing.  in January 1967, MACS-24 was assigned to Marine Air Control Group 48.

See also

 Organization of the United States Marine Corps
 List of United States Marine Corps aviation support units

References

External links
 MACS-24’s official website

Military units and formations in Virginia
Radar
4th Marine Aircraft Wing